Private Stock  may refer to:

 Private Stock Records, a record label which was started in 1974 by Larry Uttal 
 Private Stock (album), a 1995 album by The Grapes
 Private Stock (malt liquor)
 Private Stock Clothing Line, company founded by Jonathan Koon